2014 World Wheelchair Basketball Championship may refer to:

 2014 Men's World Wheelchair Basketball Championship 
 2014 Women's World Wheelchair Basketball Championship

 
Wheelchair Basketball World Championship